The LVSV (Liberaal Vlaams StudentenVerbond (Dutch) or Liberal Flemish Students' Association) unites all Dutch speaking classical-liberal and libertarian students in Belgium. The values they uphold are individual freedom, freedom of speech, free trade and human rights, with focus on the non-aggression principle. The LVSV opposes big government in any meaning (both right-wing and left-wing). They are an independent organisation, not affiliated to any political party. The LVSV organises political activities (debates, discussions,…) as well as typical student activities (visiting pubs, organising a cantus,…) in five cities: Antwerp, Brussels, Ghent, Hasselt and Leuven. The current national president is Anthony Planquette. Famous former members include Guy Verhofstadt (Open Vld), Bart De Wever (N-VA), Zuhal Demir (N-VA), Akbar Ali Akram, Willy De Clercq (Open Vld), Karel De Gucht (Open Vld) and Egbert Lachaert (Open Vld), most of whom have or had a political career as member of Open Vld.

External links 
LVSV national board
Ghent chapter
Leuven chapter
Brussels chapter
Antwerp chapter
Hasselt chapter
LibertySeminar.be

Student organisations in Belgium